Persicula masirana is a species of sea snail, a marine gastropod mollusk, in the family Cystiscidae.

References

masirana
Gastropods described in 1972
Cystiscidae